Franz Pfeffer von Salomon (19 February 1888 – 12 April 1968) during the Nazi regime known as Franz von Pfeffer, was the first Supreme Leader of the Sturmabteilung (SA) after its re-establishment in 1925. Pfeffer resigned from his SA command in 1930 and was expelled from the Nazi Party in 1941. He died in 1968.

Early years
Pfeffer was born the son of a Prussian bureaucrat, the oldest of seven children. He was from a noble family of the Lower Rhine. After graduating from the gymnasium he studied law at the University of Heidelberg. He worked briefly as a law clerk prior to starting a military career. He attended military school for two years and entered military service in October 1910. He became a Fahnenjunker (officer candidate) and served in Infantry Regiment No. 13 (1st Westphalian) throughout the First World War on the Western Front in both combat and staff positions, earning the Iron Cross 1st and 2nd Class. Discharged with the rank of Hauptmann at the war’s end in November 1918, he became active in the Freikorps. He formed and led the Westphalian “Freikorps von Pfeffer” in the Baltic states, the Ruhr and Upper Silesia until March 1920. He then participated in the failed Kapp Putsch and was detained for a time, but granted an amnesty in 1921. He was very active in organizing resistance groups to put an end to the French occupation of the Ruhr (1923–25). He began to be involved in right wing politics, joining the Völkisch-Social Bloc in 1924 and becoming the Chairman of its Landesverband (State Association) in the Province of Westphalia from May 1924 to March 1925.

Nazi Party and SA career
Pfeffer joined the Nazi Party in March 1925 (membership number 16,101) shortly after the ban on it in the aftermath of the Beer Hall Putsch was lifted. He was named Gauleiter of Westphalia on 27 March 1925. In September 1925, he became a member of the National Socialist Working Association, a short-lived group of northern and western German Gauleiters, organized and led by Gregor Strasser, which unsuccessfully sought to amend the Party program. It was dissolved in 1926 following the Bamberg Conference.  

Pfeffer remained Gauleiter in Westphalia until 7 March 1926 when his Gau was merged with Gau North Rhineland to form Großgau Ruhr. He then ran the large new Gau in a triumvirate of sorts with Gauleiters Joseph Goebbels and Karl Kaufmann. Pfeffer was simultaneously the Gau SA-Führer. However, disputes and jealousies between them led to a reorganization ordered by Adolf Hitler on 20 June 1926 with Kaufmann remaining as the sole Gauleiter.
 
In August 1926, Pfeffer was charged by Hitler with the leadership of the entire SA. This was formalized on 1 November, when he was granted the title Oberster SA-Führer (Supreme SA Leader). He was the first SA commander upon its re-establishment in 1925, following its temporary abolition in 1923 in the wake of the abortive Beer Hall Putsch. Heinrich Himmler became Pfeffer's secretary in Munich. 

Pfeffer set about strengthening and reorganizing the SA. He established seven new regional level SA-Oberführer commands in March 1928. In February 1929, their title was changed to OSAF-Stellvertreter (Deputy Supreme SA Leader). During his tenure, the SA expanded from around 30,000 to over 60,000. On 1 April 1930, Pfeffer was made Korpsführer of the newly established National Socialist Automobile Corps, the forerunner of the National Socialist Motor Corps (NSKK).
  
Pfeffer developed fundamental disagreements with Hitler about the nature of the SA. Whereas Hitler tried to place limitations on the autonomy of the SA, Pfeffer sought to strengthen the organization and make it more independent of the Party organization. Pfeffer saw the SA as a military/revolutionary institution that would eventually displace the Reichswehr to become a mass people’s army and overthrow the Weimar Republic. Hitler, however, favored a legal seizure of power through the electoral process. In his view, the SA's job was to assist in the party's propaganda efforts through leafleting, to provide security at Party rallies and, when necessary, to battle political opponents in the streets. Pfeffer demanded (at a Nazi leadership conference held on 2 and 3 August 1930) that the SA be represented on the NSDAP electoral list in the upcoming Reichstag elections and that it be granted three secure seats in the Reichstag. Hitler refused and Pfeffer submitted a letter of resignation on 12 August, effective 29 August. Hitler accepted Pfeffer's resignation and on 2 September assumed personal command of the SA as Oberster SA-Führer. He then summoned Ernst Röhm to return to Germany from Bolivia to effectively run the SA as its Stabschef (Chief of Staff), since Hitler had no interest in running the day-to-day operations of the SA. Röhm took up his new post in January 1931.

Later years
Pfeffer remained a member of the SA on active service with its General Inspectorate until April 1933. He was then put into the reserve leadership cadre of the SA. He was, however, elected to the Reichstag on 6 November 1932.
 
Pfeffer was now treated with suspicion in Nazi party circles. Following Rudolf Hess’s flight to Scotland in May 1941, Pfeffer was briefly arrested and released. However, he was expelled from the party on 14 November 1941 and from the Reichstag on 27 November. He was by that point essentially retired, living on his estate in Pommern. Following the failed assassination attempt on Hitler in the 20 July 1944 plot, he was arrested again and this time held for several months. He survived the Second World War, even commanding a Volkssturm division near the war’s end. He was then briefly interned in Heilbronn by the Allies until 1946. He was active in the Hessian State Association of the German Party during the late 1940s and early 1950s. He lived in Wiesbaden until 1960 and then in Munich, passing away in 1968 at the age of 80.

Family
His brother, Friedrich Pfeffer von Salomon (1892–1961), was an SA-Obergruppenführer, who served as the Police President in Kassel (1933–1936) and the Nazi Party  Regierungspräsident in Wiesbaden (1936–1939; 1941–1943)

Awards and decorations
1914 Iron Cross 2nd Class
1914 Iron Cross 1st Class
1918 Wound Badge in Black

|-

See also
Gausturm

Notes

Weblink

References
 

 
 

 

1888 births
1968 deaths
Burials at Munich Waldfriedhof
Gauleiters
German Army personnel of World War I
German untitled nobility
Heinrich Himmler
Kapp Putsch participants
Members of the Reichstag of Nazi Germany
Members of the Reichstag of the Weimar Republic
Military personnel from Düsseldorf
National Socialist Working Association members
Nazi Party officials
Nobility in the Nazi Party
People from the Rhine Province
Prussian Army personnel
Recipients of the Iron Cross (1914), 1st class
Recipients of the Iron Cross (1914), 2nd class
Sturmabteilung officers
20th-century Freikorps personnel
Volkssturm personnel